Malaysia–Singapore Airlines (abbreviation: MSA) was the flag carrier of Malaysia and Singapore. It came into being in 1966 as a result of a joint ownership of the airline by the governments of the two countries. The airline ceased operations after six years in 1972 when both governments decided to set up their own national airlines, Malaysian Airline System (now named Malaysia Airlines Berhad) and Singapore Airlines.

History

The airline traced its roots to the formation of Malayan Airways in 1946. With its first flight on 1 May 1947, piloted by Jimmy Brown with Ken Wood as his radio operator and navigator, the Singapore-based carrier flew on domestic routes between Kuala Lumpur, Ipoh, Penang and Singapore on an Airspeed Consul twin engined aeroplane. In April 1948, the airline flew direct international routes from Singapore to Saigon (now Ho Chi Minh City) in Vietnam; Batavia (now Jakarta), Medan and Palembang in Indonesia; and to Bangkok in Thailand via Penang. It also flew a route connecting Penang with Medan.

The airline grew rapidly in the next few years, boosted by rising demand for air travel during the post-war period, where flying was no longer a privilege for the very rich. By 12 April 1960, the airline was operating Douglas DC-3s, Lockheed L-1049 Super Constellations and Vickers Viscounts on new routes from Singapore to Hong Kong and from Kuala Lumpur to Bangkok via Penang. Flights were also introduced from Singapore to cities in the Borneo Territories including Brunei, Jesselton (now Kota Kinabalu), Kuching, Sandakan and Sibu.

On 1 April 1965, Borneo Airways Limited was officially amalgamated with Malaysian Airways and the merged company was renamed Malaysia–Singapore Airlines the following year to reflect the political changes between Malaysia and Singapore.

The last of 30 Boeing 737-100s built was delivered to Malaysia–Singapore Airlines in October 1969. This resulted in the return of the last MSA de Havilland Comet 4s leased from British Overseas Airways Corporation (BOAC) being returned to that airline.

Name changes

The airline saw its name changed twice due to political shifts. In 1963, the creation of the Federation of Malaysia prompted a change of name to "Malaysian Airways". Singapore's expulsion from the federation in 1965 led to another name change to Malaysia–Singapore Airlines (MSA) when the two separate governments took joint ownership of the airline in 1966.

MSA Building
MSA had its downtown offices at Robinson Road in Singapore's business district. The building later became SIA building.

Breakup
The different needs of the two shareholders, however, led to the break-up of the airline just six years later. The Singapore government preferred to develop the airline's international routes, while the Malaysian government preferred to develop a domestic network first before going regional and eventually, long-haul. MSA ceased operations in 1972, with its assets split between two new airlines; Malaysian Airline System Berhad (now Malaysia Airlines), and Singapore Airlines.

With Singapore Airlines determined to develop its international routes, it took the entire fleet of seven Boeing 707s and five Boeing 737s which would allow it to continue servicing the regional and long-haul international routes. Since most of MSA's international routes were flown out of Singapore, the vast majority of international routes were in the hands of Singapore Airlines. In addition, MSA's headquarters, which was located in Singapore, became the headquarters of Singapore Airlines.

Malaysian Airline System, on the other hand, took all domestic routes within Malaysia and international routes out of the country, as well as the remaining fleet of Fokker F27 Friendships and Britten-Norman BN-2 Islanders. It began flights on 1 October 1972.

The initials MSA were well regarded as an airline icon and both carriers tried to emulate them. Malaysian went for MAS by just transposing the last two letters and choosing the name Malaysian Airline System, whereas Singapore originally used the name Mercury Singapore Airlines to keep the MSA initials, but that was blocked following widespread protests in Malaysia. Eventually, the new entity was named SIA instead.

Corporate affairs
In the 1960s Malaysian Airways was headquartered in Raffles Place, Singapore. By 1971 the headquarters had moved to the MSA Building on Robinson Road in Singapore.

Gallery

Fleet
Over the years, the airline operated many aircraft including:

Past destinations

Malayan Airways
 Brunei - Brunei Town
 Burma - Mergui, Rangoon
 British Hong Kong 
 Indonesia - Batavia / Djakarta, Medan, Palembang
 Malaya - Alor Setar, Ipoh, Kota Bharu, Kuala Lumpur, Kuala Terengganu, Kuantan, Malacca, Penang, Singapore, Taiping
 Philippines - Manila
 Sabah- Jesselton, Labuan, Lahad Datu, Sandakan, Tawau
 Sarawak - Kuching, Sibu, Miri
 Thailand - Bangkok
 South Vietnam - Saigon

Malaysia–Singapore Airlines
  Australia
 Melbourne - Tullamarine Airport
 Perth - Perth Airport
 Sydney - Mascot Airport
  Bahrain
 Manama - Bahrain International Airport
  Greece
 Athens - Ellinikon International Airport
  British Hong Kong - Kai Tak Airport
  British Raj /  India
 Bombay - Santacruz International Airport
  Indonesia
 Denpasar - Ngurah Rai International Airport
 Jakarta - Kemayoran Airport
 Medan - Polonia International Airport
  Italy
 Rome - Leonardo da Vinci–Fiumicino Airport
  Japan
 Nagoya - Komaki Airport
 Osaka - Itami Airport
 Tokyo - Haneda Airport
  Malaysia
 Kota Kinabalu - Kota Kinabalu International Airport
 Kuala Lumpur - Kuala Lumpur International Airport
 Kuching - 
 Penang - Penang International Airport
  Philippines
 Manila - Manila International Airport
  Singapore - Kallang Airport and Singapore International Airport
  Ceylon / Sri Lanka
 Colombo - Katunayake Airport
  Switzerland
 Zürich - Zürich Airport
  Taiwan
 Taipei - Songshan Airport
  Thailand
 Bangkok - Don Mueang International Airport
  United Kingdom
 London - Heathrow Airport
  South Vietnam
 Saigon - Tan Son Nhat International Airport
  West Germany
 Frankfurt - Frankfurt Airport

Accidents and incidents 
Borneo Airways and Malaysian Airways each had one aircraft accident while operating. Aircraft operated by successor Malaysia–Singapore Airlines were involved in five accidents resulting in hull loss.

 30 January 1967: Douglas DC-3 (9M-AMU)
 5 March 1967: Scottish Aviation Twin Pioneer (9M-ANO)
 17 May 1967: Scottish Aviation Twin Pioneer (9M-ANC)
 5 December 1969: Britten-Norman BN-2 Islander (9M-APE)
 23 November 1971: Fokker F27 Friendship (9V-BCU)

See also 
 History of Malaysia Airlines
 History of Singapore Airlines

References

Further reading
 "MSA: the name may stay." Flight International. 22 July 1971. p. 115 (Archive)-116 (Archive).

External links

 Aviation Safety Network
 Airliners.net Photos
 Historical Timetables

Defunct airlines of Malaysia
Defunct airlines of Singapore
Airlines established in 1966
Airlines disestablished in 1972
1966 establishments in Malaysia
1966 establishments in Singapore
1972 disestablishments in Malaysia
1972 disestablishments in Singapore
Malaysian companies established in 1966

ms:Sejarah Penerbangan Malaysia#Malaysian Airlines Limited dan Malaysia-Singapore Airlines